Adrian Liston is a British immunologist and senior group leader at the Babraham Institute in Cambridge, United Kingdom. He is also a professor at the KU Leuven (Leuven, Belgium) and head of the VIB Translational Immunology Laboratory since 2009.

Liston obtained a PhD at the Australian National University in 2005. He completed postdoctoral work at the University of Washington in Seattle, United States. Liston is an advocate for both animal rights and also the use of animals in medical research.

His main research interests are in the fields of neuroimmunology, autoimmunity, primary immune deficiencies and diabetes. Liston led the discovery of Pyrin-associated auto-inflammation with neutrophilic dermatosis, a previously unknown auto-inflammatory disease caused by mutation in the gene MEFV. Liston is also known for identifying genetic fragility of pancreatic beta cells as a cause of diabetes. In 2016, Liston led a team that found that cohabitation modified the immune system, making partners more similar to each other. His research team has emphasized the role of the environment over genes in shaping the immune system. In 2017, his team identified novel mutations in the gene STAT2 which lead to primary immunodeficiency.

Liston also led a team that developed a machine learning algorithm that identifies children with juvenile arthritis with almost 90% accuracy from a simple blood test. In the neuroimmunology field he identified a role for white blood cells in the development of the brain.

Liston is the author of immunology-themed children's books, including Battle Robots of the Blood and Just for Kids! All about Coronavirus during the global COVID-19 pandemic.

Awards and appointments

Liston has received numerous awards and appointments including:

 Dr. Karel-Lodewijk Prize (2015)
 Eppendorf Young European Investigator Award (for his work in elucidating key mechanisms by which the immune system avoids attacking the body while remaining effective against pathogens) (2016) 
 Franqui Chair to lecture at the Université libre de Bruxelles (2015–2016) 
 Churchill College Senior Research Fellowship (2020)
 Academy of Medical Sciences, elected (2021)

References

British immunologists
Academic staff of KU Leuven
Belgian molecular biologists
Belgian immunologists
Australian immunologists
Australian National University alumni
Fellows of Churchill College, Cambridge
Living people
Australian medical researchers
1980 births